The oval window (or fenestra vestibuli or fenestra ovalis) is a membrane-covered opening from the middle ear to the cochlea of the inner ear.

Vibrations that contact the tympanic membrane travel through the three ossicles and into the inner ear. The oval window is the intersection of the middle ear with the inner ear and is directly contacted by the stapes; by the time vibrations reach the oval window, they have been reduced in amplitude and increased in force due to the lever action of the ossicle bones. This is not an amplification function, as often incorrectly reported. Rather, it is an impedance-matching function, allowing sound to be transferred from air (outer ear) to liquid (cochlea). 
 

It is a reniform (kidney-shaped) opening leading from the tympanic cavity into the vestibule of the internal ear; its long diameter is horizontal and its convex border is upward. It is occupied by the base of the stapes, the circumference of which is fixed by the annular ligament to the margin of the foramen.

Additional images

See also
 Round window

References

External links
 Diagram at Washington University School of Medicine
 The Anatomy Wiz. Oval Window

Auditory system
Ear